The organizers of ISL introduced eISL, a FIFA video game tournament, for the ISL playing clubs, each represented by two players. ATK Mohun Bagan hosted a series of qualifying games for all the participants wanting to represent the club in eISL. On 20 November the club announced the signing of the two players.

Roster

Seasons

References

ATK Mohun Bagan FC
Esports teams based in India
Esports teams established in 2020